The coast worm lizard (Cynisca leucura) is a worm lizard species in the family Amphisbaenidae. It is found in western Africa. The coast worm lizard is a relatively small round-headed amphisbaenid, roughly about 250mm in snout-vent length.

References

Cynisca (lizard)
Reptiles described in 1839
Taxa named by André Marie Constant Duméril
Taxa named by Gabriel Bibron